John Holdsworth  (born 1949) is a retired Anglican Archdeacon.

Holdsworth has four degrees from the University of Wales. He was ordained deacon in 1973, priest in 1974. After a curacy in Newport he was Vicar of Abercraf then Gorseinon. He was Warden of St. Michael's College, Llandaff from 1997 to 2003; Archdeacon of St David's from 2003 to 2010; and Archdeacon of Cyprus from 2010 until his retirement in 2019.

References

1949 births
Alumni of the University of Wales
Archdeacons of St Davids
Archdeacons of Cyprus
Church in Wales archdeacons
20th-century Welsh Anglican priests
21st-century Welsh Anglican priests
Living people
Wardens of St Michael's College, Llandaff